The Rancho San Andrés Castro Adobe is a historically and architecturally significant house located in the Pájaro Valley, California. The two-story Rancho San Andrés Castro Adobe is a historic rancho hacienda that was built between 1848-49.

History

The house was built in 1848–1849 by Juan José Castro. His father Jose Joaquin Castro (1768–1838), came to California as a 6-year-old with his family from Sinaloa Mexico on the 1775–1776 Anza Expedition.   Jose Joaquín Castro received this Mexican land grant Rancho San Andrés in the area of present-day Watsonville, California.
It had the first dance floor (fandango room) in Santa Cruz County, California and one of the first indoor kitchens (cocina). It is the only two-story hacienda ever built in Santa Cruz County.

The house was added to the National Register of Historic Places listings in Santa Cruz County, California on December 12, 1976.
It is California Historical Landmark number 998. The adobe was severely damaged in the 1989 Loma Prieta earthquake. One wall had completely collapsed, and the house needed seismic retrofitting before being safe for the public. Owner Edna Kimbro sold it to the state of California in 2002. Starting in August 2007, Friends of California State Parks volunteers and the California Conservation Corps began restoration by making 2500 adobe bricks.

Almost 100 members of the Castro family held a reunion at the site in 2008.
 it was not yet  opened to the public as a state park, but it is expected to open in 2016 as Rancho San Andres Castro Adobe Historic State Park.

References

External links 
 Office of Historic Preservation — entry #998
 Friends of Santa Cruz State Parks — website on the Castro Adobe
 Chronicling the Castro Adobe — a restoration blog

History of Santa Cruz County, California
Adobe buildings and structures in California
Houses on the National Register of Historic Places in California
Houses on the National Register of Historic Places in Santa Cruz County, California
Houses in Santa Cruz County, California
Proposed museums in the United States
National Register of Historic Places in Santa Cruz County, California